Chatfield High School is a public high school located in southeastern Minnesota approximately ten miles south of Rochester, Minnesota in the town of Chatfield, United States. Located in Olmsted County, the school has approximately 350400 students enrolled full-time. It can also be identified as Chosen Valley High School.

References

External links
 

Public high schools in Minnesota
Schools in Olmsted County, Minnesota